A circle route (also circumference, loop, ring route, ring line or orbital line) is a public transport route following a path approximating a circle or at least a closed curve.

The expression "circle route" may refer in particular to:
 a route orbiting a central point, commonly the central business district (CBD) in a city or large town
 a route running in approximately a circular path from a point near the centre of a city or town out to a peripheral point and back again
 a feeder route running from an interchange station around a neighbourhood or suburb in approximately a circle

Typically, a circle route will connect at several locations with one or more cross-city routes or radial routes offering services in a straighter line into or out of a city or town centre.  When a circle route orbits a central business district in a large arc, it will often provide transverse (or lateral) links between suburbs or satellites, either on its own or in combination with other routes.  Such connections assist travellers by reducing travel times, avoiding congested centres, and sometimes reducing the number of transfers.  Similar benefits may also be achieved by half-circle routes or peripheral cross-city routes.

The oldest circular rapid transit line was London's Inner Circle, today the Circle line of the London Underground, which was completed in 1884, operated by two separate companies. The route chosen forms the general border of what is today central London. This was followed by the Glasgow Subway which opened in 1896, with the system unchanged to this day. In Moscow Metro, a railway from 1908 was reopened as a passenger line in 2016. More recently, line 3 of the Copenhagen Metro opened in 2019, connecting the city centre to the northern and eastern suburbs. In some cities such as Paris, where lines 2 and 6 encircle the city, multiple services together can effectively form a circular route.

Circle routes can also be found in commuter rail networks, namely in Sydney and Melbourne, with Sydney's City Circle being built in 1926 and Melbourne's City Loop in 1978.

See also 
 Ring road, a road with a circular route

References

External links 
metrobits.org: Metro Rings and Loops – includes a list of commuter rail and rapid transit circle routes worldwide

Public transport
Transportation planning